The Tanganyika lates (Lates angustifrons)is a species of lates perch endemic to Lake Tanganyika. It is a widespread predator on other fishes. This species is important commercially and is also popular as a game fish. It is threatened by the pressures that these activities put upon the population.

Despite its common name, it is not the only lates in Tanganyika. The three other species in this lake are the bigeye lates (L. mariae), forktail lates (L. microlepis) and sleek lates (L. stappersii).

References

Lates
Taxonomy articles created by Polbot
Fish described in 1906